The dark-caped Atlantic spiny rat or Mirapitanga spiny rat (Trinomys mirapitanga), is a spiny rat species from South America. It is found in Brazil.

Also known as the Pau Brazil Spiny Rat, it is known only from specimens found at two locations on the southern Bahia coast, the Pau-Brasil Ecological Station and the Fazenda São João.

References

Trinomys
Mammals described in 2002
Taxa named by James L. Patton